The Bronze Award is the third highest award in Girl Scouts of the USA. It was introduced by GSUSA in 2001, and can only be earned by Girl Scouts at the Junior level.

Prerequisites

Girls must be in 4th or 5th grade (or equivalent), be a registered Girl Scout Junior, and have completed a Junior Journey before they can begin work on a Bronze Award project.

Bronze Award steps
 Go on a Girl Scout Junior Journey.
 Build your Girl Scout Junior team.
 Explore your community.
 Choose your Girl Scout Bronze Award project.
 Make a plan.
 Put your plan in motion.
 Spread the word.

Junior Journey

There are currently seven Junior Journey programs to choose from. All badges in the Journey must be earned for the Journey to be complete.

 Agent of Change. It's Your World, Change It! (three badges, sold as a complete set)
 Power of One Award
 Power of Team Award
 Power of Community Award 

 Get Moving! It's Your Planet, Love It! (three badges, sold as a complete set)
 Energize Award
 Investigate Award
 Innovate Award 

 aMUSE! It's Your Story, Tell It! (three badges, sold as a complete set)
 Reach Out! Award
 Speak Out! Award
 Try Out! Award 

 Think Like a Citizen Scientist (two badges, sold separately)
 Junior Think Like a Citizen Scientist Award
 Junior Take Action Award

 Think Like a Programmer (two badges, sold separately)
 Junior Think Like a Programmer Award
 Junior Take Action Award

 Think Like an Engineer (two badges, sold separately)
 Junior Think Like an Engineer Award
 Junior Take Action Award

 Outdoor Journey (four badges, sold separately)
 Junior Camper
 Animal Habitats
 Eco Camper
 Junior Take Action Award

Bronze Award Project

The Bronze Award Project is a team effort by a group of Juniors, usually from a single troop.  The project's objective must be to benefit the local community and/or benefit Girl Scouting as a whole in some way.  Each scout is expected to contribute 20 hours to the project.  The project is to be girl-led, but, unlike the Silver and Gold Awards, adults may be on-hand to assist and guide.

Approval

The approval process varies by council.  Before beginning work on a Take Action Project or a Bronze Project, it is important to check with the local council.

See also

 Girl Scouts of the USA
 Gold Award (Girl Scouts of the USA)
 Silver Award (Girl Scouts of the USA)

External links
 Overview of the Girl Scout Bronze Award
 https://www.girlscouts.org/en/our-program/grade-levels/what-juniors-do.html
 https://www.girlscouts.org/en/about-girl-scouts/traditions/ceremonies.html
 https://www.girlscouts.org/en/our-program/highest-awards/highest-awards-faq.html
Scout and Guide awards
Girl Scouts of the USA